Zlatko Komadina (born 24 October 1958) is a Croatian politician who has been prefect of Primorje-Gorski Kotar County since 2013.

Komadina resigned as Minister of Maritime Affairs, Transport and Infrastructure in the Cabinet of Zoran Milanović in April 2012, only three months into his mandate, citing health reasons.

References

Living people
1958 births
Government ministers of Croatia
Social Democratic Party of Croatia politicians
Politicians from Rijeka
Politicians from Ljubljana